The 2012 China League One was the ninth season of the China League One, the second tier of the Chinese football league pyramid, since its establishment. It began on March 17, 2012 and ended on October 28, 2012.
The size of the league has been expanded from 14 to 16 teams this season.

Team changes

Promotion and relegation 
Dalian Aerbin as the champion of 2011 season and Guangzhou R&F as runner-up had promoted to the 2012 Chinese Super League. They were replaced by Chengdu Blades and Shenzhen Ruby, who had relegated from the 2011 Chinese Super League after finishing the season in the bottom two places of the table.

Guizhou Zhicheng had relegated to the 2012 China League Two after finishing the 2011 season in last place and lost play-off match against 2011 China League Two 3rd-placed team Fujian Smart Hero. Due to the league's expansion, three teams were admitted into the 2012 China League One. These were the two 2011 League Two promotion final winners, Harbin Songbei Yiteng, Chongqing F.C., and the play-off winner, Fujian Smart Hero.

Name changes 
Shenyang Dongjin moved to the city of Hohhot and changed their name to Hohhot Dongjin in February 2012.

Clubs

Stadiums and Locations

Managerial changes

Foreign players

Restricting the number of foreign players strictly to four per CL1 team. A team could use three foreign players on the field each game. Players came from Hong Kong, Macau and Chinese Taipei were deemed as native players in CSL.

 Foreign players who left their clubs after first half of the season.

Hong Kong/Macau/Taiwan players (doesn't count on the foreign player slot)

League table

Positions by round

Top scorers

League attendance

References

External links 
Official website 
China League One at sina.com 
China League One at sohu.com 

China League One seasons
2
China
China